Vendresse is a commune in the Ardennes department and Grand Est region of north-eastern France.

Population

The inhabitants of Vendresse are known as Vendressois.

Sights
Arboretum de Vendresse

See also
Communes of the Ardennes department

References

Communes of Ardennes (department)
Ardennes communes articles needing translation from French Wikipedia